Rodney Earl Lewis (born April 2, 1959) is a former American football defensive back. He played for the New Orleans Saints from 1982 to 1984.

References

1959 births
Living people
Central High School (Minneapolis, Minnesota) alumni
Players of American football from Minneapolis
American football defensive backs
Nebraska Cornhuskers football players
New Orleans Saints players